Philpot is an unincorporated community in Daviess County, in the U.S. state of Kentucky.

Demographics

History
A post office has been in operation under the name Philpot since the 1870s. Philpot was named for Augustus J. Philpot, an early settler.

Education
Philpot used to have an elementary school until it closed down in 2005.  Since then, elementary school students from Philpot attend Country Heights Elementary School, which is located on Highway 54 at the easternmost reaches of Owensboro.

References

Unincorporated communities in Daviess County, Kentucky
Unincorporated communities in Kentucky